Scissurella reticulata is a species of minute sea snail, a marine gastropod mollusk or micromollusk in the family Scissurellidae, the little slit snails.

Description
The shell has a diameter of 2 mm. The white shell is thin, transparent, and glassy. It has an ovate shape, but it is rather depressed. The spire consists of 3½ convex whorls that increase pretty rapidly The striae of growth are cut into a reticulation by impressed transverse lines. The umbilicus is moderate, showing none of the whorls. The aperture is obliquely ovate.

Distribution
This species occurs in the Red Sea.

References

 Bouchet, P. & Danrigal, F., 1982. Napoleon's Egyptian campaign (1798-1801) and the Savigny collection of shells. The Nautilus 96(1): 9-24
 Yaron, 1983.  A review of the Scissurellidae (Mollusca, Gastropoda) of the Red Sea. Annalen des Naturhistorischen Museums in Wien 84B: 263-379
 Geiger, D.L. (2012). Monograph of the little slit shells. Volume 1. Introduction, Scissurellidae. pp. 1-728. Volume 2. Anatomidae, Larocheidae, Depressizonidae, Sutilizonidae, Temnocinclidae. pp. 729-1291. Santa Barbara Museum of Natural History Monographs. Number 7.

External links
 To Biodiversity Heritage Library (4 publications)
 To Encyclopedia of Life
 To USNM Invertebrate Zoology Mollusca Collection
 To World Register of Marine Species
 Yaron, I. (1983). A review of the Scissurellidae (Mollusca: Gastropoda) of the Red Sea. Annalen des Naturhistorischen Museums in Wien. Serie B für Botanik und Zoologie. 84: 263-279

Scissurellidae
Gastropods described in 1853